James, Azadanus and Abdicius (died April 10, 380) are martyrs of the Christian Church. James was a priest and Azadanus and Abdicius deacons. They were beheaded by Shapur II in Persia in 380. They are collectively commemorated with a feast day on April 10.

References
Holweck, F. G. A Biographical Dictionary of the Saints. St. Louis, MO: B. Herder Book Co., 1924.

Saints trios
380 deaths
Deacons
4th-century Christian martyrs
4th-century Christian clergy
Year of birth unknown